Nightmare is a contemporary Bosnian bestseller novel by Zlatko Topčić published in 1997. 

The novel set the guidelines and became a model for other Bosnian novels. It received the prestigious Annual Award of the Association of Writers of Bosnia and Herzegovina. 

It was translated into Turkish (Saray Bosna da kabus, Gendas, Istanbul, 1998) and Slovenian (Mora, Založba Goga, Novo Mesto, 2003).

Characters
Adi Solak, an intellectual, a journalist, a critic, an essayist
Aca Nikolić, Solak's double, Chetnik Duke

References

1997 novels
Fiction set in the 20th century
Bosnia and Herzegovina culture
Bosnia and Herzegovina literature
Novels set in Bosnia and Herzegovina
Novels about nightmares